Prenolepis is a genus of ants in the subfamily Formicinae. Most species are found in southeastern Asia and southern China, but the genus has a wide distribution with species known from North America, southern Europe, Anatolia, Cuba, Haiti, and West Africa.

Species
Prenolepis angularis Zhou, 2001
Prenolepis cyclopia Chen & Zhou, 2018
Prenolepis darlena Williams & LaPolla, 2016
Prenolepis dugasi Forel, 1911
Prenolepis fisheri Bharti & Wachkoo, 2012
Prenolepis fustinoda Williams & LaPolla, 2016
†Prenolepis henschei Mayr, 1868
Prenolepis imparis (Say, 1836)
Prenolepis jacobsoni Crawley, 1923
Prenolepis jerdoni Emery, 1893
Prenolepis lakekamu Williams & LaPolla, 2018
Prenolepis mediops Williams & LaPolla, 2016
Prenolepis melanogaster Emery, 1893
Prenolepis naoroji Forel, 1902
Prenolepis nepalensis Williams & LaPolla, 2018
Prenolepis nitens (Mayr, 1853)
Prenolepis quinquedenta Chen & Zhou, 2018
Prenolepis shanialena Williams & LaPolla, 2016
Prenolepis striata Chen & Zhou, 2018
Prenolepis subopaca Emery, 1900

References

External links

Formicinae
Ant genera